The Council of Cannstatt, also referred to as the blood court at Cannstatt (Blutgericht zu Cannstatt), was a council meeting at Cannstatt, now a part of Stuttgart, in 746 that took place as a result of an invitation by the Mayor of the Palace of Austrasia, Carloman, the eldest son of Charles Martel, of all nobles of the Alemanni.

According to the annals of Metz, the annales Petaviani and an account by Childebrand, Carloman arrested several thousand noblemen who attended accusing them of taking part in the uprising of Theudebald, Duke of Alamannia and Odilo, Duke of Bavaria, and summarily executed them all for high treason. The number of deaths is a matter of debate. The action eliminated virtually the entire tribal leadership of the Alemanni and ended the independence of the duchy of Alamannia, after which it was ruled by Frankish dukes.

Bibliography 
R. Christlein et al.: Die Alamannen. Archäologie eines lebendigen Volkes. Stoccarda 1978
Karlheinz Fuchs, Martin Kempa, Rainer Redies: Die Alamannen (Catalogo della mostra), Theiss, Stoccarda, 2001 
Dieter Geuenich: Geschichte der Alemannen. Kohlhammer Verlag, Stoccarda 2004 , 
Zur Geschichte der Alamannen (Wege der Forschungen), Darmstadt, 1979

References

See also
 Blood court
 Stockholm Bloodbath (similar event in Swedish history)
 Massacre of Verden

Alemanni
746
8th century in Germany
Cannstatt